The 2012 NBA Europe Live Tour was a basketball exhibition tour featuring teams from the NBA and the Euroleague, as a part of the NBA Global Games. The hosting countries were Turkey, Germany, Italy and Spain.

Teams
The NBA teams that participated were:
 Boston Celtics (2nd participation) 
 Dallas Mavericks

The Euroleague teams that participated were:
 Fenerbahçe Ülker
 Alba Berlin
 Olimpia Milano (2nd participation) 
 FC Barcelona Regal (3d participation)

Games

See also
2012 EuroLeague American Tour
List of NBA versus international games

References

External links
Official NBA Website

NBA Global Games
Europe
2012–13 Euroleague